The  Paramount Model 120 Sportster floatplane, also called the Paramount Model 120 Speedster for the landplane version, was an attempt to build a low production aircraft suitable for the small high-end market during the depression era economy.

Design and development

Walter J. Carr and Ed Behse founded the Paramount Aircraft Corporation to build the Paramount Cabinaire enclosed biplane. After poor sales of the aircraft, Carr left the company and Behse pursued a new design using the Warner engine used in the Cabinaire.

The Sportster was a two-seat side-by-side configuration open-cockpit, strut-braced, low-wing monoplane with a radial engine and float landing gear sourced from Aircraft Products. The prototype was built in six weeks and featured a red leather interior.

Operational history
The prototype was test flown and then demonstrated at the 1931 National Aircraft Show in Detroit, receiving several orders. On 16 May 1931 company owner Behse gave demonstration rides in the aircraft. On the second flight of the day, his passenger was Whitney Merritt, who helped assemble the aircraft. The aircraft took off, climbed to 150 feet of altitude and dove into the water, killing both occupants. The company was dissolved soon after.

Specifications (Paramount Model 120 Sportster)

References

1930s United States civil utility aircraft
Low-wing aircraft
Aircraft first flown in 1931